Iowa City West High School is a public high school in Iowa City, Iowa. It serves grades 9-12 for the Iowa City Community School District.

Athletics 
The Trojans compete in the Mississippi Valley Conference in the following sports:
Cross Country
 Boys' 1988 Class 3A State Champions
 Girls' 5-time State Champions (1997, 1998, 2000, 2001, 2004)
Volleyball
 2-time Class 4A State Champions (2010, 2011)
Football
 3-time Class 4A State Champions (1995, 1998, 1999)
Basketball
 Boys' 7-time State Champions (1977, 1998, 2000, 2012, 2013, 2014, 2017)
 Girls' 2012  Class 5A State Champions 
Girls’2018 Class 5A State Champions
Wrestling
 2-time Class 3A State Champions (2006, 2007)
Swimming
 Boys 2020 State Champions 
Track and Field
 Boys' 2-time Class 4A State Champions (2007, 2012)
 Girls' 6-time State Champions (2000, 2001, 2006, 2007, 2008, 2010) 
Golf
 2010 Class 2A Coed State Champions
Soccer
 Boys' 9-time State Champions (2000, 2003, 2005, 2009, 2010, 2012, 2013, 2014, 2017)
 Girls' 2-time State Champions (2004, 2015)
Softball
Baseball
Tennis
 Boys' 9-time Class 2A State Champions (1995, 2005, 2006, 2012, 2013, 2014, 2016, 2017, 2019)
 Girls' 4-time Class 2A State Champions (2004, 2005, 2006, 2018)
Bowling

Notable alumni
Frances Haugen (2002), engineer and Facebook whistleblower
Nate Kaeding (2000), retired NFL placekicker for the San Diego Chargers, was selected to two Pro Bowl games
Bridget Kearney (2003), Lake Street Dive bassist
 Diego Lasansky (2012), painter and printmaker
 Laura Leighton (1986) starred on Fox's Melrose Place, a supporting character in ABC Family's Pretty Little Liars 
 Zach Wahls (2009), LGBT activist, author, and Iowa Senator from the 37th District.
 Dan Gill (2002), actor in films, television, and commercials including The Office, Paranormal Activity series, and The Wedding Ringer.

See also
 The Miracle Season - 2018 film about the school's participation in the State Girls Volleyball Championship of 2011.
List of high schools in Iowa
Category:Iowa City West High School alumni

References

External links
West High's home page

Public high schools in Iowa
Buildings and structures in Iowa City, Iowa
Schools in Johnson County, Iowa
1968 establishments in Iowa
Educational institutions established in 1968